Vietbocap is a genus of troglobiontic scorpions in the family Pseudochactidae native to South-East Asia.

References 

Scorpion genera
Pseudochactidae
Fauna of Southeast Asia
Cave arachnids
Taxa named by Wilson R. Lourenço